Label Rouge (Red Label) is a sign of quality assurance in France as defined by Law No. 2006-11 (5 January 2006).

Products eligible for the Label Rouge are food items (including seafood) and non-food and unprocessed agricultural products such as flowers. According to the French Ministry of Agriculture: "The Red Label certifies that a product has a specific set of characteristics establishing a superior level to that of a similar current product".

Aquaculture
In 1992, Scottish salmon was the first fish and first non-French product to be awarded the Label Rouge quality mark, the official endorsement by the French authorities of the superior quality of a food or farmed product, particularly with regard to taste.

To obtain this recognition, a very stringent set of standards prepared by a group of producers must be approved. These standards establish the criteria which the product must meet throughout the production chain, including farming techniques, feed, processing and distribution.

Approval is officially announced through a joint decree from the Minister for Agriculture and Fisheries and the Minister for Consumer Affairs, on the recommendations of the National Institute for Origin and Quality (INAO). INAO is the French public body responsible for quality and origin marks relating to food products.

Scottish Quality Salmon is the standard owner of Label Rouge No. LA 33/90. Compliance with the standards is controlled by an independent certifying body, Acoura, formerly Food Certification International Ltd. Suppliers of whole Label Rouge Scottish salmon and Label Rouge Scottish salmon portions can be found on the Label Rouge Saumon Ecossais website.

A Quality Benchmark
The quality manual for Label Rouge LA 33/90 specifies all the requirements for attaining this superior quality standard.

The PGI manual defines the criteria for product origin.

The following are significant elements of Label Rouge Scottish salmon’s exceptional quality:-

 The feed is composed entirely of products of marine origin, vegetable materials, vitamins and carotenoids
 The flesh contains a maximum of 16% lipid
 An identification system is implemented to ensure traceability of the salmon throughout the production process up to point of sale, guaranteeing origin and compliance with the stringent production criteria
 Freshness guaranteed by an "eat by date" of 10 days after harvesting
 Salmon are reared in accordance with codes of best practice and with respect for fish welfare, the environment and sustainability
 Maximum stocking density in seawater pens is 1.5% fish and 98.5% water
 Guaranteed Scottish origin

Full traceability
The origin of each Label Rouge salmon can be identified through a sequentially numbered tag allocated by the certifying body.

This tag is attached to the fish gill and includes the following information:-

 The Label Rouge logo
 The approval number
 An individual identification number
 A “use-by” date
 The contact details of the certifying body

In addition, each box carries a sequentially numbered label, also supplied by the certifying body.

References

This article has been translated in part from the French Wikipedia equivalent.

External links
 Label Rouge on the French Ministry of Agriculture and Food website 

French business law
Consumer symbols